1810 in sports describes the year's events in world sport.

Boxing
Events
 December — English champion Tom Cribb retains his title by defeating Afro-American Tom Molineaux, who was born into slavery, in the 39th round of their championship bout

Cricket
Events
 The impact of the Napoleonic War has been felt by cricket since 1797, when inter-county matches simply ceased, and there has been a steady decline in both number and quality of major matches during the first decade of the 19th century until they became few and far between after 1810.  Nevertheless, the impact of this war has been less severe than that of the Seven Years' War because of the existence this time of MCC and other well-organised clubs like Brighton and Montpelier.  These clubs manage to co-ordinate cricket activities during the war emergency and, as it were, keep the game going.
 William Ward makes his debut in first-class cricket.
England
 Most runs – William Lambert 396 (HS 132*)
 Most wickets – William Lambert 31

Horse racing
England
 2,000 Guineas Stakes – Hephestion
 The Derby – Whalebone
 The Oaks – Oriana
 St Leger Stakes – Octavian

References

 
1810